Prisoners' Wives is a BBC drama series, created and written by Julie Gearey and starring Polly Walker, Pippa Haywood, Emma Rigby, Natalie Gavin, Sally Carman and Karla Crome, with supporting cast including Iain Glen, Adam Gillen, Jonas Armstrong, Reuben Johnson, Enzo Cilenti and Owen Roe. The series centres on four very different women, each struggling to cope with a significant man in her life serving time in prison. The series is set in Sheffield, South Yorkshire. Series one was six episodes long, and premiered on Tuesday 31 January 2012. Series two was a shorter run of four episodes, and began on Thursday 14 March 2013 on BBC One.

Main cast

Series 1
Emma Rigby as Gemma Roscoe
Polly Walker as Francesca Miller
Pippa Haywood as Harriet Allison
Natalie Gavin as Lou Bell

Series 2
Polly Walker as Francesca Miller
Pippa Haywood as Harriet Allison
Sally Carman as Kim Haines
Karla Crome as Aisling O'Connor

Supporting cast

Series 1
Jonas Armstrong as Steve Roscoe
Iain Glen as Paul Miller
Adam Gillen as Gavin Allison
Reuben Johnson as Sean Lowe
Andrew Tiernan as DS David Hunter
David Bradley as Frank
Harry McEntire as Matt Miller
Phoebe Dynevor as Lauren Miller
Adrian Rawlins as Ian, the Prison Chaplain

Series 2
Iain Glen as Paul Miller
Adam Gillen as Gavin Allison
Enzo Cilenti as Mick Haines
Owen Roe as Brendan O'Connor
Nicola Walker as DCI Jo Fontaine
David Bradley as Frank
Harry McEntire as Matt Miller
Phoebe Dynevor as Lauren Miller
Anne Reid as Margaret
Adrian Rawlins as Ian, the Prison Chaplain

Episodes

Series 1

Series 2

Production
Prisoners’ Wives is executive produced for Tiger Aspect by Roanna Benn, Rebecca de Souza and Greg Brenman (Tiger's Head of Drama) and for the BBC by Christopher Aird. Damon Thomas and Harry Bradbeer direct with Anna Ferguson as producer and Abi Bach as co-producer. The series was commissioned for BBC One by Ben Stephenson and Danny Cohen for airing in early 2012.

Ratings
The first series attracted an average consolidated audience of 5.26 million. The average consolidated audience for the second series was 4.86 million.

References

External links

2012 British television series debuts
2013 British television series endings
2010s British drama television series
BBC television dramas
British prison television series
English-language television shows
Television series by Endemol
Television shows set in Sheffield
Television series by Tiger Aspect Productions